Reid Ewing (born November 7, 1988) is an American actor and musician known for his role as Dylan in the ABC comedy Modern Family and as Charlie Plunk in the TV series Zeke and Luther (2009–2011).

Early life, family and education
Ewing is from Broward County, Florida. He appeared in theater productions in the South Florida area. He studied at the Dreyfoos School of the Arts in West Palm Beach and the School for Film and Television in New York before moving to Los Angeles.

Career
In April 2010, he was cast for the MTV film The Truth Below.

In addition to acting, Ewing plays the piano, guitar, and banjo. He wrote the song "In the Moonlight (Do Me)", which his character performed on Modern Family.

In 2011, he appeared in Wendy's "Where's the beef?" commercials.

Personal life
In 2015, Ewing revealed that he has suffered from body dysmorphic disorder, which resulted in several cosmetic surgeries. He came out as gay on November 23, 2015, while again addressing his body dysmorphia.

Filmography

Films

Television

References

External links
 
 

1988 births
Living people
American male television actors
American gay actors
American gay musicians
Male actors from Florida
21st-century American male actors
Guitarists from Florida
LGBT people from Florida
American male guitarists
21st-century American singers
21st-century American guitarists
21st-century American male singers
20th-century LGBT people
21st-century LGBT people